The Consulate General of the United States of America in Hamburg is a diplomatic mission representing the United States of America to the city of Hamburg and the State of Schleswig Holstein in  the Federal Republic of Germany. The Government of Hamburg counts the promotion of the then Vice-Consul John Parish to the rank of a consul in 1793 as the establishment of the first mission. The consulate-general represents the interests of the United States government in the German states of Hamburg, Bremen, Lower Saxony, Mecklenburg-Vorpommern, and Schleswig-Holstein.

History

The first American mission to Hamburg was established in 1790 and John Parish was named Vice Consul. In 1793 Parish was promoted to the rank of a consul. In 1897, Hugh Pitcairn was appointed to the consulate, and in 1903 appointed to be Consul General by President Roosevelt.

During the participation of the US in the First and Second World War all consulates in the German Empire were closed. On 1 March 1946 the US Government reopened the consulate in Hamburg, and in 1950 purchased the building at Alsterufer on the shore of Lake Außenalster.

In 2007 Ms. Karen E. Johnson succeeded Duane C. Butcher as consul general in Hamburg. As of 2009, 31 consuls and 22 consuls general had served in Hamburg. The current Consul General is Darion Akins, who began serving in July 2019.

Facilities

In 1882 the larger one of the two houses was built, and in 1893 the smaller building was finished by architect Martin Haller, who also designed the Hamburg Rathaus. From 1933 until 1945 the Nazi Party used the houses as Hamburg headquarters. After the war, the British forces confiscated the houses, and in 1950 the US Government bought them from the heirs of the original owners.  Eventually a structure was built between the two houses to create one single building.

After a renovation the consulate moved into the house in 1951. The Consulate General is commonly called das Weiße Haus an der Alster (the White House on the Alster) in Hamburg. Since threats against American embassies, 9/11, and a direct threat against the consulate in Hamburg, the security of the US Consulate General in Hamburg was often strengthened. On 1 April 2009, the Hamburger Morgenpost used the consulate for an April Fools' Day news, that because of security reasons the consulate will move to a WW II shelter at Heiligengeistfeld.  In the late 1990s portions of what used to be a larger property belonging to and surrounding the Consulate were sold off to raise needed cash for the US Embassy in Berlin.  The Consulate is known for placing a large Christmas tree every year on the balcony over the entrance.

Neighbourhood
The artificial lake Außenalster is in front of the American consulate in the Rotherbaum quarter. The railway station Dammtor is nearby to the South.

References

External links

United States
Hamburg
Germany–United States relations
Politics of Hamburg
Buildings and structures in Hamburg-Mitte